The 12th Chess Olympiad (12-ya Shakhmatnaya olimpiada), organized by the FIDE and comprising an open team tournament, as well as several other events designed to promote the game of chess, took place between August 31 and September 25, 1956, in Moscow, Soviet Union.

The host nation were double defending champions and naturally huge favourites, and they lived up to expectations. Although their victory margin wasn't as big as two years before, they still won comfortably, with Yugoslavia and Hungary taking home the silver and bronze medals, respectively.

Results

Preliminaries

A total of 34 teams entered the competition and were divided into four preliminary groups of eight or nine teams. The top three from each group advanced to Final A, the teams placed 4th–6th to Final B, and the rest to Final C. All groups and finals were played as round-robin tournaments.

Group 1 was won by the Soviet hosts, well ahead of Bulgaria and Switzerland. Poland, Sweden, and Norway took the places 4–6, while Puerto Rico and Saar finished at the bottom of the group.

Yugoslavia took first place in group 2, ahead of Israel and Denmark. Netherlands, Austria, and France made up the middle part of the group, while Mongolia and Scotland had to settle for the bottom.

Group 3 was won by Argentina, ahead of West Germany and England. Iceland, Chile, and Finland took the places 4–6, while India, Luxembourg, and Ireland finished at the bottom of the group.

Hungary clinched group 4, ahead of Romania and Czechoslovakia. East Germany, Colombia, and Belgium made up the middle part of the group, while the Philippines, Greece, and Iran completed the field.

 Group 1 

 Group 2 

 Group 3 

 Group 4

Final

{| class="wikitable"
|+ Final A
! # !!Country !! Players !! Points !! MP
|-
| style="background:gold;"|1 ||  || Botvinnik, Smyslov, Keres, Bronstein, Taimanov, Geller || 31 || 
|-
| style="background:silver;"|2 ||  || Gligorić, Matanović, Ivkov, Karaklajić, Milić, Đurašević || 26½ || 17
|-
| style="background:#cc9966;"|3 ||  || Szabó, Barcza, Benkő, Szilágyi, Bély, Portisch || 26½ || 16
|-
| 4 ||  || Najdorf, Bolbochán, Panno, Pilnik, Sanguineti, Wexler || 23 || 
|-
| 5 ||  || Unzicker, Schmid, Darga, Pfeiffer, Niephaus, Teschner || 22 || 12
|-
| 6 ||  || Padevsky, Minev, Kolarov, Tringov, Tsvetkov, Milev || 22 || 10
|-
| 7 ||  || Filip, Pachman, Šefc, Rejfíř, Alster, Ježek || 20½ || 
|-
| 8 ||  || Golombek, Penrose, Wade, Milner-Barry, Clarke, Phillips || 20 || 
|-
| 9 ||  || Blau, Bhend, Walther, Keller, Johner || 19 || 9
|-
| 10 ||  || Larsen, Poulsen, Pedersen, Ingerslev, Nielsen, Enevoldsen || 19 || 8
|-
| 11 ||  || Bălănel, Ciocâltea, Troianescu, Soós, Ghițescu, Rădulescu || 19 || 7
|-
| 12 ||  || Czerniak, Porat, Aloni, Oren, Dobkin, Smiltiner || 15½ || 
|-
|}

{| class="wikitable"
|+ Final B
! # !!Country !! Players !! Points !! MP
|-
| 13 ||  || Robatsch, Dückstein, Kinzel, Prameshuber, Lokvenc, Busek || 28 || 
|-
| 14 ||  || Ólafsson, Jóhannsson, Möller, Thorbergsson, Gíslason, Guðmundsson || 27 || 
|-
| 15 ||  || Ståhlberg, Stenborg, Sköld, Backlund, Joffe, Ljungqvist || 26½ || 
|-
| 16 ||  || O'Kelly, Dunkelblum, Limbos, Thibaut, Boey, Van den Broeck || 23½ || 
|-
| 17 ||  || Ojanen, Salo, Rantanen, Fred, Hänninen, Niemelä || 22½ || 
|-
| 18 ||  || Cuéllar,  Sánchez, De Greiff, Velandia, Restrepo, Reyes Larenas || 21 || 11
|-
| 19 ||  || Prins, Kramer, Bouwmeester, Mühring, Van Steenis || 21 || 10
|-
| 20 ||  || Uhlmann, Dittmann, Herrmann, Fuchs, Koch, Platz|| 20½ || 
|-
| 21 ||  || Muffang, Boutteville, Burstein, Noradounguian, Catozzi || 19½ || 
|-
| 22 ||  || Flores, Letelier, Hausman, Jáuregui, Jiménez Rojas, Mallett || 19 || 9
|-
| 23 ||  || Śliwa, Plater, Dworzyński, Gromek, Szapiro, Balcarek || 19 || 7
|-
| 24 ||  || Vestøl, Morcken, Lindblom, Johannessen, Barda, Rojahn || 16½ ||
|}

{| class="wikitable"
|+ Final C
! # !!Country !! Players !! Points !! MP
|-
| 25 ||  || Badilles, Campomanes, Benítez, Cardoso || 24 || 
|-
| 26 ||  || Benkner, Lorson, Weichselbaumer, Folz V., Both G., Schmidt P. || 23 || 
|-
| 27 ||  || Sapre, Gupta, Mhaiskar, Venkatraman S. || 20½ || 
|-
| 28 ||  || Safvat, Mostafavi-Kachani, Navabi, Lotfy, Assar, Nazarian || 19 || 
|-
| 29 ||  || Colón Romero A., Colón Romero M., Pla, Benítez, Borrás, Reissmann || 18½ || 11
|-
| 30 ||  || Zhugder, Zhamsaran, Möömöö, Tumurbator, Tserendagva, Namzhil || 18½ || 9
|-
| 31 ||  || Fairhurst, Fallone, McGowan, Thomson, Middleton, Rose M.|| 17½ || 
|-
| 32 ||  || Siaperas, Angos, Loverdos, Anastasopoulos, Mastihiadis, Pavlatos || 17 || 
|-
| 33 ||  || Maher, Reilly, Walsh, Dunphy, Grogan, O'Riordan || 13 || 
|-
| 34 ||  || Wantz, Conrady, Schneider, Schmitz F., Philippe, Kremer || 9 || 
|}

Final A

Final B

Final C

Individual medals

 Board 1:  Bent Larsen 14 / 18 = 77.8%
 Board 2:  Andreas Dückstein 13 / 17 = 76.5%
 Board 3:  Paul Keres 9½ / 12 = 79.2%
 Board 4:  David Bronstein 11 / 13 = 84.6%
 1st reserve:  Raúl Sanguineti 9 / 11 = 81.8%
 2nd reserve:  Efim Geller 7½ / 10 = 75.0%

Due to a special rule for the top board at Olympiads, Larsen's result automatically earned him the GM title (the rule has since been abolished).

References

12th Chess Olympiad: Moscow 1956 OlimpBase

12
Olympiad 12
Chess Olympiad 12
Olympiad 12
1956 in Soviet sport
Chess Olympiad
Chess Olympiad
Chess Olympiad